Mahlon Beresford Baker Romeo (born 19 September 1995) is an Antiguan professional footballer who plays for Cardiff City. Romeo, who plays as a defender, also features for the Antigua and Barbuda national football team.

Career

Gillingham
Born in the London Borough of Westminster, Romeo joined Gillingham in the summer of 2012 on a two-year scholarship, having previously played in the academies of clubs Arsenal and Wycombe Wanderers. In January 2013, Romeo joined Conference South side Dover Athletic on a youth loan. He made his debut in a 5–2 away defeat to Farnborough. He made his professional debut for Gillingham on the final day of the 2012–13 season as the Gills were crowned champions of Football League Two, a 3–2 away defeat at Burton Albion.

Millwall
In the summer of 2015, Romeo signed for Millwall and featured regularly in the first team by the second half of his first season with the Lions. He scored on his debut for Millwall, in a 3-0 League One win in February 2016 against Walsall. In May 2017, Romeo played the full 90 minutes as the Lions beat Bradford City 1–0 in the 2016-17 Football League One Playoff final at Wembley Stadium to gain promotion to the Championship.

Romeo then scored his first goal of the club's 2017-18 season in a 3–1 win over Sheffield United.

On 31 August 2021,  Romeo joined Portsmouth on loan for the 2021–22 season.

Cardiff City
On 15 June 2022, Romeo joined Championship club Cardiff City for an undisclosed fee on a three-year deal. Romeo had previously played with new manager Steve Morison at Millwall.

Personal life
Romeo is the son of music producer and musician Jazzie B, who is best known as the frontman of the R&B group Soul II Soul.

Career statistics

Club

International

Honours
Millwall
EFL League One play-offs: 2017

References

External links
Mahlon Romeo on Twitter

1995 births
Living people
Footballers from Westminster
Antigua and Barbuda footballers
Antigua and Barbuda international footballers
English footballers
Association football defenders
Gillingham F.C. players
Dover Athletic F.C. players
Millwall F.C. players
Portsmouth F.C. players
Cardiff City F.C. players
English Football League players
National League (English football) players
English sportspeople of Antigua and Barbuda descent
Black British sportspeople